Sergei Aleksandrovich Solovyov (born 9 March 1915; died 11 February 1967) was a Soviet professional footballer.

Club career
He made his professional debut in the Soviet Top League in 1939 for FC Dynamo Leningrad. He also played ice hockey and bandy professionally.

Honours
 Most league goals ever for FC Dynamo Moscow: 135.
 Soviet Top League top scorer: 1940, 1948.
 Soviet Top League champion: 1940, 1945, 1949.
 Soviet Top League runner-up: 1946, 1947, 1948, 1950.
 Soviet Top League bronze: 1952.
 Soviet Cup finalist: 1945, 1949, 1950.
 Soviet Hockey League champion: 1947.
 Soviet bandy champion: 1951, 1952.

References

1915 births
1967 deaths
People from Sokol, Vologda Oblast
People from Kadnikovsky Uyezd
Soviet footballers
Association football forwards
Soviet Top League players
FC Dynamo Moscow players
Soviet ice hockey players
Soviet bandy players
FC Dynamo Saint Petersburg players
Sportspeople from Vologda Oblast
Russian footballers